Eden is an unincorporated community in Randolph County, Illinois, United States.

The community is best known for supposedly containing a "station" (safe house) for escaped slaves along the Underground Railroad coming up from Chester on their way to Canada during the American Civil War.

References

Unincorporated communities in Randolph County, Illinois
Unincorporated communities in Illinois